An Act for prohibiting Trade with the Barbadoes, Virginia, Bermuda and Antego or Act prohibiting Commerce and Trade with the Barbodoes, Antigo, Virginia, and Bermudas alias Summer's Islands was an Act of law passed by the Rump Parliament of England during the Interregnum against English colonies which sided with the Crown in the English Civil War.

Although the newer, Puritan settlements in North America, most notably Massachusetts, were dominated by Parliamentarians, the older colonies sided with the Crown. Six colonies recognized Charles II after the regicide in 1649: Antigua, Barbados, Bermuda, Virginia, Maryland, and Newfoundland. The Parliamentarians were busy subduing Royalists in Scotland, Ireland, the Isles of Scilly, the Isle of Man, and the Channel Islands, and could not immediately force their rule on the colonies. The Virginia Company's settlements, Bermuda and Virginia (Bermuda was the first colony to recognize Charles II, deposing its Parliamentarian Governor and electing a replacement, while its Independent Puritans were expelled, settling the Bahamas under William Sayle), as well as Antigua and Barbados were conspicuous in their loyalty to the Crown, and were singled out by the Rump Parliament in An Act for prohibiting Trade with the Barbadoes, Virginia, Bermuda and Antego, which was passed on the 30 October 1650.

The Act read:

See also 
English overseas possessions in the Wars of the Three Kingdoms
English Civil War
Wars of the Three Kingdoms

References and note

Acts of the Parliament of England
North America in the English Civil War
Interregnum (England)
History of British Antigua and Barbuda
History of the Colony of Barbados
History of Bermuda
History of Virginia